Julia Brown is an American-born artist who works in photography, installation and video.  Her work is largely concerned with subject formation, visibility, invisibility and the political power of representation. Brown is an assistant professor of Painting in the Department of Fine Arts and Art History at George Washington University.

Education & awards 

Brown received a BA in studio art from Williams College in 2000, and an MFA from CalArts in 2006.  Brown has participated in a number of residencies, including VIR Viafarini-in-Residence, the Fondazione Ratti Corso Superiore di Arti Visive, Skowhegan School of Painting and Sculpture, and was a Visual Arts Fellow at the Fine Arts Work Center in 2008-2009 and 2010-2011. Brown was a studio fellow at the Whitney Independent Study Program in 2010, a Smithsonian Awards 2013 Artist Research Fellowship, and is currently a 2013–2014 Artist-in-Residency at the Museum of Fine Arts, Houston CORE Program.

Exhibitions 

Julia Brown has been exhibited in New York at Art in General, The Kitchen, BronxArtSpace Scaramouche Gallery, Harvestworks Media Festival, Talman + Monroe, LMAK Projects, and the Artists Space Project Room, The Brucennial; in Los Angeles at LACE and Supersonic at Barnsdall Gallery; Real Art Ways Houston; Blaffer Art Museum Wichita; Ulrich Museum of Art, Hartford; Provincetown Art Association Museum (PAAM); Via Farini, Milan; Kunsthalle Dusseldorf; Form Video, London;  Blank Projects, Cape Town, and at The Gallery Apart, Italy.

Selected bibliography 
2017     Atallah, Lara, “Critics’ Picks: New York ‘The Intricacies of Love’” Artforum

2016     Tennant, Donna, “Editor’s Picks: Julia Brown,” Visual Art Source, April 2016.

2014     Lewis, Abigail, “Interview with Mike Watson – The Gallery Apart,” NERO Magazine. January 2014.

2012	 Hope, Eric, “East City Art Reviews” ’19 Ways of Looking at a Painting’ at Porch Projects.” 

2009	 Parsons, Laura, “Body of Work: Brown Offers an Object-ive View,” The Hook.

2009	 Genocchio, Benjamin, “Collective Strangeness in Hartford,” New York Times, 21 Dec., 2009.

2008	 Hoffman, Hank. Blog. "Diverse 'Archaeology of Wonder' show at Real Art Ways," Connecticut Art Scene. 10 Dec., 2008.

2008	 Caruth, Nicole, “Near Sighted Far Out; Julia Brown,” Harvestworks Digital Media Arts Center. 26 Sept., 2008.

2006	 Fette. Blog. “CalArts MFA Open Studios,” The Flog. 12 April 2006.

Selected publications 
2016 Frater, Sally, The Swim, Catalogue, Ulrich Museum of Art, Wichita, KS

2015 LeClere, Mary, Core 2015, Catalogue, The Core Program, Museum of Fine Arts Houston. 5, 6-9, 78.

2014 Leclere, Mary, 2013-4 Core Program, The Core Program, Museum of Fine Arts Houston. 7, 8-9, 35.

2010 Brown, Julia, Abbey Dubin, Till Gathmann, Elaine Reynolds, “A Survey for the Art Affiliated” in Anna Danera and Hans Haacke eds., Give and Take, Catalogue, Milan, Italy: Mousse Publishing

2006 “Coco Fusco at MC,” Afterall Journal. Ed. Thomas Lawson. 18 Oct. 2006.

References

External links 
Official Website for Julia Brown

1978 births
Living people
George Washington University faculty
Williams College alumni
Skowhegan School of Painting and Sculpture alumni